Johannes Peter "Honus" Wagner (February 24, 1874 – December 6, 1955), sometimes referred to as Hans Wagner, was an American baseball shortstop who played 21 seasons in Major League Baseball from 1897 to 1917, almost entirely for the Pittsburgh Pirates. Wagner won his eighth (and final) batting title in 1911, a National League record that remains unbroken to this day, and matched only once, in 1997, by Tony Gwynn. He also led the league in slugging six times and stolen bases five times. Wagner was nicknamed "the Flying Dutchman" due to his superb speed and German heritage.  This nickname was a nod to the popular folk-tale made into a famous opera by the German composer Richard Wagner.
In , the Baseball Hall of Fame inducted Wagner as one of the first five members. He received the second-highest vote total, behind Ty Cobb's 222 and tied with Babe Ruth at 215.

Most baseball historians consider Wagner to be the greatest shortstop ever and one of the greatest players ever. Ty Cobb himself called Wagner "maybe the greatest star ever to take the diamond". Honus Wagner is also the featured player of one of the rarest and the most valuable baseball cards in existence.

Early life
Wagner was born to German immigrants Peter and Katheryn Wagner in the borough of Chartiers, in what is now Carnegie, Pennsylvania.

Wagner was one of nine children. As a child, he was called Hans by his mother, which later evolved into Honus. "Hans" was also an alternate nickname during his major league career. Wagner dropped out of school at age 12 to help his father and brothers in the coal mines. In their free time, he and his brothers played sandlot baseball and developed their skills to such an extent that three of his brothers went on to become professionals as well.

Wagner's older brother, Albert "Butts" Wagner, who had a brief major league career himself, is often credited with getting Honus his first tryout. Butts persuaded his manager to take a look at his younger brother. Following his brother, Wagner trained to be a barber before becoming successful in baseball.

In 1916, Wagner married Bessie Baine Smith, and the couple had three daughters: Elva Katrina (b. 1918, stillborn), Betty Baine (1919–1992), and Virginia Mae (1922–1985).

Professional career

Career before Major League Baseball

Honus' brother Albert "Butts" Wagner was considered the ballplayer of the family. Albert suggested Honus in 1895 when his Inter-State League team was in need of help. Wagner played for five teams in that first year, in three different leagues over the course of 80 games.

In 1896, Edward Barrow, from the Wheeling Nailers team that Wagner was playing on, decided to take Honus with him to his next team, the Paterson Silk Sox (Atlantic League). Barrow proved to be a good talent scout, as Wagner could play wherever he was needed, including all three bases and the outfield. Wagner hit .313 for Paterson in 1896 and .375 in 74 games in 1897.

Louisville Colonels

Recognizing that Wagner should be playing at the highest level, Barrow contacted the Louisville Colonels, who had finished last in the National League in 1896 with a record of 38–93. They were doing better in 1897 when Barrow persuaded club president Barney Dreyfuss, club secretary Harry Pulliam, and outfielder-manager Fred Clarke to go to Paterson to see Wagner play. Pulliam, though, persuaded Dreyfuss and Clarke to take a chance on him. Wagner debuted with Louisville on July 19 and hit .338 in 61 games.

By his second season, Wagner was already one of the best hitters in the National League although he came up short a percentage point from finishing the season at .300. Following the  season, the NL contracted from twelve to eight teams, with the Colonels one of four teams eliminated. Owner Barney Dreyfuss, who had purchased half ownership in the Pirates, took Wagner and many of his other top players with him to the Pittsburgh team.

Tommy Leach recounted his impressions of joining the Louisville club in 1898 with hopes of winning the starting job at third base:

Pittsburgh Pirates
The move to the Pittsburgh Pirates signified Wagner's emergence as a premier hitter. In 1900, Wagner won his first batting championship with a .381 mark and also led the league in doubles (45), triples (22), and slugging percentage (.573), all of which were career highs. For the next nine seasons, Wagner's average did not fall below .330.

In , the American League began to sign National League players, creating a bidding war, which depleted the league of many talented players. Wagner was offered a $20,000 contract by the Chicago White Sox, but turned it down and continued to play with the Pirates.

Prior to 1904, Wagner had played several positions but settled into the shortstop role full-time that season, where he became a skilled fielder. His biography on BaseballBiography.com describes his gritty style:

Bowlegged, barrel-chested, long-limbed ... he was often likened to an octopus. When he fielded grounders, his huge hands also collected large scoops of infield dirt, which accompanied his throws to first like the tail of a comet.

In August 1899, he became the first player credited with stealing second base, third, and home in succession under the new rule differentiating between advanced bases and stolen bases. He repeated the feat in 1902, 1907, and 1909. Wagner retired with the National League record for most steals of home (27), which was broken by Greasy Neale in 1922.

In September 1905, Wagner signed a contract to produce the first bat with a player's signature, the Louisville Slugger, becoming the first sportsperson to endorse a commercial product; the Honus Wagner was to become a best-seller for years. One month later, with one point separating him from Reds center fielder Cy Seymour for the batting title, Wagner fell short in a head-to-head matchup on the final day of the season, with Seymour collecting four hits to Wagner's two, as contemporary press reports stated that the fans were far more interested in the Seymour-Wagner battle than in the outcome of the games.

Shortly before the  season, Wagner retired. In desperation, owner Barney Dreyfuss offered him $10,000 per year, making him the highest-paid Pirate for many years. He returned to the Pirates early in the 1908 season, and finished two home runs short of the league's Triple Crown, leading the league in hitting (for the sixth time)‚ hits‚ total bases‚ doubles‚ triples‚ RBI‚ and stolen bases. Wagner took over the batting lead from the New York Giants' flamboyant outfielder Mike Donlin during a July 25 game against the Giants and their star pitcher Christy Mathewson. Wagner was 5-for-5 in the game; after each hit, he reportedly held up another finger to Donlin, who went hitless, and who had just beaten runner-up Wagner by a wide margin in a "most popular player" poll.

Bill James cites Wagner's 1908 season as the greatest single season for any player in baseball history. He notes that the league ERA of 2.35 was the lowest of the dead-ball era and about half of the ERAs of modern baseball. Since Wagner hit .354 with 109 RBI in an environment when half as many runs were scored as today, he asks, "if you had a Gold Glove shortstop, like Wagner, who drove in 218 runs, what would he be worth?"

He was the first winner of 'The World's Championship Batsman' 's Cup, in 1908, made by Welshman George "Honey Boy" Evans.

1903 and 1909 World Series

In , the Pirates played the Boston Americans in Major League Baseball's inaugural World Series. Wagner, by this point, was an established star and much was expected of him, especially since the Pirates' starting rotation was decimated by injury. Wagner himself was not at full strength and hit only .222 for the series. The Americans, meanwhile, had some fans, called the "Royal Rooters" who, whenever Wagner came to bat, sang "Honus, Honus, why do you hit so badly?" to the tune of "Tessie", a popular song of the day. The Rooters, led by Boston bartender Michael "Nuf Ced" McGreevy, even traveled to Pittsburgh to continue their heckling. Pittsburgh lost in the best-of-nine series, five games to three, to a team led by pitchers Cy Young and Bill Dinneen and third baseman–manager Jimmy Collins. Christy Mathewson, in his book "Pitching in a Pinch" wrote: "For some time after "Hans" Wagner's poor showing in the world's series of 1903 ... it was reported that he was "yellow" (poor in the clutch). This grieved the Dutchman deeply, for I don't know a ballplayer in either league who would assay less quit to the ton than Wagner ... This was the real tragedy in Wagner's career. Notwithstanding his stolid appearance, he is a sensitive player, and this has hurt him more than anything else in his life ever has."

Wagner was distraught by his performance. The following spring, he refused to send his portrait to a "Hall of Fame" for batting champions, citing his play in the World Series.  "I was too bum last year", he wrote. "I was a joke in that Boston-Pittsburgh Series. What does it profit a man to hammer along and make a few hits when they are not needed only to fall down when it comes to a pinch?  I would be ashamed to have my picture up now."

The Pirates faced Ty Cobb's Detroit Tigers. The series was the only meeting of the two superior batsmen of the day, and the first time that the batting champions of each league faced one another (this later occurred thrice more, in 1931, 1954, and 2012 World Series). Wagner was by this time 35 years old, Cobb just 22.

This time, Wagner could not be stifled as he outhit Cobb, .333 to .231, and stole six bases, establishing the new Series record. The speed demon Cobb only managed two steals, one of which Cobb himself admitted was a botched call. Wagner recounted: "We had him out at second. We put up a squawk, but Silk O'Loughlin, the umpire, overruled it. We kept the squawk going for a minute or so, making no headway of course, and then Cobb spoke up. He turned to O'Loughlin, an American League umpire, by the way, and said, 'Of course I was out. They had me by a foot. You just booted the play, so come on, let's play ball.'"

There was also a story that was widely circulated over the years and famously recounted in Lawrence Ritter's The Glory of Their Times, that at one point Cobb was on first; he bragged to Wagner that he was going to steal second and threatened to assault him physically doing it; Wagner defiantly dared him to try it and placed an especially rough tag to Cobb's mouth; and the two exchanged choice words. Cobb denied it in his autobiography, and the play-by-play of the 1909 World Series confirms that the event could not have happened as stated: Cobb was never tagged out by Wagner in a caught-stealing. 
The Pirates won the series in seven games behind the pitching of rookie Babe Adams.

Later career

In 1910, Wagner's average fell to .320, his lowest average since . Nevertheless, he aged exceptionally well; the three highest OPS+ seasons by any shortstop aged 35 or older belong to Wagner, and even his age-41 season ranks eighth on the list.

Wagner won the 1911 batting title by the narrowest of margins. He went hitless in a 1–0 win against the Cubs on May 30, but a successful league protest by the Cubs wiped out the result (and Wagner's at-bats). Wagner ended up edging the Boston Rustlers' Doc Miller, .334 to .333. The Pirates were in contention into August, but an ankle injury sidelined Wagner for 25 games and the team slid from the race.

On June 9, at age 40, Wagner recorded his 3,000th hit, a double off Philadelphia's Erskine Mayer, the second player in baseball history to reach the figure, after Cap Anson, and Nap Lajoie joined them three months later. This accomplishment, however, came during a down period for Wagner and Pirates. Wagner hit only .252 in 1914, the lowest average of his career. In July 1915, he became the oldest player to hit a grand slam, a record which stood for 70 years until topped by 43-year-old Tony Pérez. In 1916, Wagner became the oldest player to hit an inside-the-park home run.

In , following another retirement, Wagner returned for his final, abbreviated season. Returning in June, he was spiked in July and played only sparingly for the remainder of the year, batting .265. He briefly held the role of interim manager, but after going 1–4, Wagner told owner Dreyfuss the job was not for him. He retired as the NL's all-time hit leader, with 3,430.  (Subsequent research has since revised this total to 3,418.)  It took 45 years for St. Louis' Stan Musial to surpass Wagner's hit total.

Wagner has been considered one of the very best all-around players to ever play baseball since the day he retired in 1917. Baseball historian and statistician Bill James named Honus Wagner as the second-best player of all time after Babe Ruth, rating him as the best major league player in 1900 and each year from 1902 to 1908. Statisticians John Thorn and Pete Palmer rate Wagner as ninth all-time in their "Total Player Ranking". Many of the greats who played or managed against Wagner, including Babe Ruth, Ty Cobb, Rogers Hornsby, and Walter Johnson, list him at shortstop on their All-Time teams.

Life after baseball

Wagner was not finished playing baseball after his retirement from major league baseball. He managed and played for a semi-pro team.
Arky Vaughan, Ralph Kiner, Pie Traynor (player-manager from –), and Hank Greenberg (although Greenberg was in his final major league season in 1947, his only season with the Pirates, and very well established) all future Hall of Famers, were notable "pupils" of Wagner. During this time, he wore uniform number 14 but later changed it to his more famous 33, which was later the number retired for him. (His entire playing career was in the days before uniform numbers were worn.) His appearances at National League stadiums during his coaching years were always well received and Wagner remained a beloved ambassador of baseball. Wagner also coached baseball and basketball at Carnegie Institute of Technology, which is now part of Carnegie Mellon University.

In 1928, Wagner ran for the office of Sheriff of Allegheny County, Pennsylvania, but lost. He was appointed as a deputy of the Allegheny County Sheriff's Office in 1942. He also ran a well-known sporting goods company. A sporting goods store bearing the name "Honus Wagner" operated in downtown Pittsburgh for 93 years before closing permanently in 2011.

The Pirates hosted the 1944 Major League Baseball All-Star Game at Forbes Field. Wagner was invited to be an honorary coach for the National League squad, the first time this honor was bestowed in Major League Baseball's All-Star Game.

Wagner lived the remainder of his life in Pittsburgh, where he was well known as a friendly figure around town. He died on December 6, 1955, at the age of 81, and he is buried at Jefferson Memorial Cemetery in the South Hills area of Pittsburgh.

Film legacy
Wagner, along with his famous baseball card, was one of the earliest athletes to make the crossover into pop culture film. He starred as a sports hero in 1919's Spring Fever with Moe Howard and Shemp Howard of the Three Stooges, and has been depicted as the subject of The Winning Season (2004) and in a brief scene in Cobb (1994).

Baseball legacy

When the Baseball Hall of Fame held its first election in 1936, Wagner tied for second in the voting with Babe Ruth, trailing Cobb. A 1942 Sporting News poll of 100 former players and managers confirmed this opinion, with Wagner finishing 43 votes behind Cobb and six ahead of Ruth. In 1969, on the 100th anniversary of professional baseball, a vote was taken to honor the greatest players ever, and Wagner was selected as the all-time shortstop. In 1999, 82 years after his last game and 44 years since his death, Wagner was voted Number 13 on The Sporting News list of the 100 Greatest Players, where he was again the highest-ranking shortstop. That same year, he was selected to the Major League Baseball All-Century Team by the oversight committee, after losing out in the popular vote to Cal Ripken Jr. and Ernie Banks.

Christy Mathewson asserted that Wagner was the only player he faced who did not have a weakness. Mathewson felt that the only way to keep Wagner from hitting was not to pitch to him.

"A stirring march and two-step", titled "Husky Hans", and "respectfully dedicated to Hans Wagner, Three-time Champion Batsman of The National League" was written by William J. Hartz in 1904.

Bill James says that Wagner is easily the greatest shortstop of all time, noting that the difference between Wagner and the second greatest shortstop, in James' estimation Arky Vaughan, is roughly the same as the gulf between Vaughan and the 20th greatest shortstop.

Wagner is mentioned in the poem Line-Up for Yesterday by Ogden Nash.

A life-size statue of Wagner swinging a bat, atop a marble pedestal featuring admiring children, was forged by a local sculptor named Frank Vittor, and placed outside the left-field corner gate at Forbes Field. It was dedicated on April 30, 1955, and the then-frail Wagner was well enough to attend and wave to his many fans. The Pirates have relocated twice since then, and the statue has come along with them. It now stands outside the main gate of PNC Park. The statue roughly faces the site of the Pirates' original home, Exposition Park, so in a sense, Wagner has come full circle.

Wagner is honored in the form of a small stadium residing behind Carnegie Elementary School on Washington Avenue in Carnegie, Pennsylvania. The stadium serves as the home field for Carlynton High School varsity sports. The Historical Society of Carnegie History Center houses the Honus Wagner Sports Museum which includes many Wagner collectibles and memorabilia. Visitors receive replicas of the famous card.

In the 1992 episode Homer at the Bat, the popular TV show The Simpsons made a reference to Wagner. The character Mr. Burns lists three ringers he wants for his company's baseball team, but they are Honus Wagner, Cap Anson, and "Mordecai 'Three Fingers' Brown". His assistant has to point out that they are not only retired but long-dead ... Anson having played in the late 19th century.

In 2000, Wagner was honored with a U.S. postage stamp. The stamp was issued as part of a "Legends of Baseball" series that honored 20 all-time greats in conjunction with MLB's All-Century team.

T206 Baseball card

The T206 Honus Wagner baseball card''' is one of the rarest and most expensive baseball cards in the world, as only 57 copies are known to exist. The card was designed and issued by the American Tobacco Company (ATC) from 1909 to 1911 as part of its T206 series. While sources allege that Wagner, a nonsmoker, refused to allow the production of his baseball card to continue, the more likely reason was the sum ATC was willing to pay Wagner. The ATC ended production of the Wagner card and a total of only 57 to 200 cards were ever distributed to the public, as compared to the "tens or hundreds of thousands" of T206 cards, over three years in 16 brands of cigarettes, for any other player. In 1933, the card was first listed at a price value of US $50 in Jefferson Burdick's The American Card Catalog, making it the most expensive baseball card at the time.

Some cards were awkwardly shaped or irregularly sized, which prompted a belief that many of the cards in the series had been altered at one point or another. In his work Inside T206: A Collector Guide to the Classic Baseball Card Set, Scot A. Reader wrote that, "It is not at all uncommon to find T206 examples that have been altered at some point during their near-century of existence." These discrepancies were taken advantage of by "card doctors" who trimmed corners and dirty edges to improve the appearance of the card. The front of all T206 series cards, including the Wagner card, displayed a lithograph of the player created by a multi-stage printing process in which a number of colors were printed on top of each other to create a lithograph with the appropriate design. The backs of the cards featured the monochromatic colors of the 16 tobacco brands for which the cards were printed. The Wagner cards in particular advertised the Piedmont and Sweet Caporal brands of cigarettes and were produced at Factory 25 in Virginia, as indicated by the factory stamp imprinted on the back of the cards.

Starting from January 1909, the ATC sought authorization from baseball players for inclusion in the T206 series, which featured 524 major league players, 76 of whom were later inducted into the Baseball Hall of Fame. Wagner had been at the top of his game throughout the decade and was even considered the game's greatest player at the time. He had appeared on advertisements for a number of other products such as chewing gum, gunpowder, and soft drinks. Unsurprisingly, the ATC asked for Wagner's permission to have his picture on a baseball card. According to an October 12, 1912, issue of The Sporting News, Wagner did not give his consent to appear on the baseball card. In response to the authorization request letter sent by John Gruber, a Pittsburgh sportswriter hired by the ATC to seek Wagner's permission, Wagner wrote that he "did not care to have his picture in a package of cigarettes". He threatened to seek legal action against ATC if they went ahead and created his baseball card.

A near mint-mint condition T206 Wagner card sold in 2007 for $2.8 million, the highest price ever for a baseball card. In 2010, a previously unknown copy of the card was donated to the School Sisters of Notre Dame in Baltimore. The card, which was in poor condition, sold in November 2010 to a collector for $262,000, well over the $150,000 that was expected at auction. The card came with Sister Virginia Muller's brother's handwritten note: "Although damaged, the value of this baseball card should increase exponentially throughout the 21st century!"

On April 20, 2012, a New Jersey resident purchased a VG-3 graded T206 Wagner card for more than $1.2 million.

On April 6, 2013, a 1909–11 T206 baseball card featuring Honus Wagner sold at auction for $2.1 million.

On October 1, 2016, a T206 Wagner card graded PSA-5 sold for $3.12 million, setting yet again the record for the highest price paid for any baseball card.

On May 29, 2019, a Honus Wagner T-206 sold for $1.2 million by SCP Auctions in Southern California. The same card had been previously auctioned for $657,250 in 2014 and $776,750 in 2016. The encapsulated card was rated as only a 2 on a scale to 10.

In May 2021, one example sold for a new record $3.75 million. In doing so, it became the second most expensive baseball card sold at auction at the time.

In August 2021, another example sold for $6.6 million exceeding the previous high for most valuable sports card at the time.

On August 3, 2022, a T206 Honus Wagner was sold in a private sale for a sports card record high of $7.25 million, eclipsing the previous high of $6.6 million.

The card featured in the plot of the Nickelodeon film Swindle.

Statistics
The numbers shown below are the figures officially recognized on MLB.com.

The figures on Baseball-Reference.com are as follows.  Other private research sites may have different figures. Caught Stealing is not shown comprehensively for Wagner's MLB.com totals because the stat was not regularly captured until 1920. Strikeouts are not shown comprehensively for Wagner's MLB.com totals, because the stat was not regularly captured until 1910. Note that mlb.com's Total Bases do not correspond to the number of hits, 2B, 3B, and HR listed.

See also

 3,000 hit club
 List of Major League Baseball career doubles leaders
 List of Major League Baseball career triples leaders
 List of Major League Baseball career runs scored leaders
 List of Major League Baseball career runs batted in leaders
 List of Major League Baseball doubles records
 List of Major League Baseball triples records
 List of Major League Baseball players to hit for the cycle
 List of Major League Baseball annual runs batted in leaders
 List of Major League Baseball batting champions
 List of Major League Baseball career stolen bases leaders
 List of Major League Baseball annual runs scored leaders
 List of Major League Baseball annual stolen base leaders
 List of Major League Baseball annual doubles leaders
 List of Major League Baseball annual triples leaders
 List of Major League Baseball player-managers
 Major League Baseball titles leaders

References

Bibliography
 Hall of Fame Network: "Honus Wagner as Mona Lisa", HOFMAG.com. Honus Wagner: A Biography, by Dennis DeValeria and Jeanne Burke DeValeria, Henry Holt and Company, New York, 1995. 
Hittner, Arthur D. Honus Wagner: The Life of Baseball's "Flying Dutchman." Jefferson, North Carolina: McFarland, 1996 and 2003 (softcover). . Winner of the 1996 Seymour Medal, awarded by the Society for American Baseball Research.Honus and Me'' by Dan Gutman (novel), Perfection Learning Corporation, 1999.

External links

The T206 Collection – The Players & Their Stories
Honus Wagner's Obit – The New York Times, Tuesday, December 6, 1955
Honus-Wagner.org

19th-century baseball players
National Baseball Hall of Fame inductees
Louisville Colonels players
Baseball players from Pennsylvania
Major League Baseball shortstops
National League batting champions
National League RBI champions
National League stolen base champions
Pittsburgh Pirates managers
Pittsburgh Pirates players
Pittsburgh Pirates coaches
Sportspeople from Pennsylvania
Major League Baseball players with retired numbers
Carnegie Mellon University faculty
People from Washington County, Pennsylvania
1874 births
1955 deaths
American people of German descent
Minor league baseball managers
Adrian Reformers players
Adrian Demons players
Steubenville Stubs players
Akron Akrons players
Lima Kids players
Mansfield Kids players
Paterson Silk Weavers players
Major League Baseball player-managers
American sportsmen
People from Carnegie, Pennsylvania